Robert Blagden Hale (29 September 1807 – 22 July 1883) was a British Conservative politician.

Hale was the son of his namesake, Robert Hale Blagden Hale and Lady Theodosia Eleanor Bourke, daughter of Joseph Bourke. He married Anne Jane, daughter of George Peter Holford, in 1832 and, before her death in 1879, they had five children: Anne Hale (1832–1895); Robert Hale (1834–1907); Matthew Holford Hale (born 1835); Theodosia Hale; and, Georgina Hale.

Hale was first elected Conservative MP for West Gloucestershire at a by-election in 1836—caused by the succession of Henry Somerset to the peerage as Duke of Beaufort—and held the seat until the 1857 general election when he did not seek re-election.

Outside of his political career, Hale was a Justice of the Peace and, in 1870, the High Sheriff of Gloucestershire.

See also
Alderley House

References

External links
 

Conservative Party (UK) MPs for English constituencies
UK MPs 1835–1837
UK MPs 1837–1841
UK MPs 1841–1847
UK MPs 1847–1852
UK MPs 1852–1857
1807 births
1883 deaths
English justices of the peace
High Sheriffs of Gloucestershire